The 2018 Norwegian Second Division was a third-tier Norwegian women's football league season. The league consisted of 67 teams divided into 7 groups. Hønefoss and Snøgg were promoted. Reserve teams were not eligible for promotion.

League tables

Group 1
Hønefoss − promotion play-offs
Kongsvinger
Røa 2
Høybråten og Stovner
Frigg
Raufoss
Øvrevoll Hosle 2
Sarpsborg 08
Hallingdal
Grei 2
Fart 2
Fjellhamar

Group 2
Snøgg − promotion play-offs
LSK Kvinner 2
Lyn 2
Vålerenga 2
Kolbotn 2
Eik Tønsberg
Gimletroll
Stabæk 2
Donn
Lier
Pors

Group 3
Bryne − promotion play-offs
Fyllingsdalen
Klepp 2
Vestsiden-Askøy
Staal Jørpeland
Haugar
Sandviken 2
Voss
Arna-Bjørnar 2
Avaldsnes 2
Hinna
Fana

Group 4
Fortuna Ålesund − promotion play-offs
KIL/Hemne
Molde
Trondheims-Ørn 2
Herd
Orkanger
Sunndal
Surnadal/Søya/Todalen
Nardo
Byåsen 2

Group 5
Innstranden − group 5/6 play-off
Bossmo & Ytteren − group 5/6 play-off
Sandnessjøen
Grand Bodø 2
Innstranden 2
Gruben/Åga
Halsøy

Group 6
Sortland − group 5/6 play-off
Mjølner − group 5/6 play-off
Medkila 2
Håkvik
Leknes
Svolvær/Henningsvær/Kabelvåg

Group 5/6 play-off
Innstranden − promotion play-offs
Bossmo & Ytteren
Mjølner
Sortland

Group 7
Tromsø − promotion play-offs
Tromsdalen
Porsanger
Polarstjernen
Tverrelvdalen
Fløya 2
Senja/Finnsnes
Bossekop 2
Furuflaten

Promotion play-offs

Group 1
Hønefoss − promoted
Bryne
Tromsø

Group 2
Snøgg − promoted
Fortuna Ålesund
Innstranden

References
2018 Norwegian Second Division at RSSSF

Norwegian Second Division (women) seasons
3
Norway
Norway